Minarti Timur (24 March 1968) is a former Indonesian badminton player who is affiliated with PB Djarum since 1987.

Career 
Though she won women's singles at the 1990 Dutch Open, Minarti was primarily a doubles player, particularly excelling in mixed doubles. During the 1990s and the early 2000s (decade), she won numerous international mixed doubles titles, the majority with Tri Kusharjanto but also, later, with Bambang Suprianto. These included the Thailand (1994, 1996), Indonesia (1995, 1996, 1997, 1998, 1999), Singapore (1995, 1998), Malaysia (1996, 1998, 2000), and Japan (2001) Opens; the Southeast Asian Games (1995); the World Badminton Grand Prix (1995); the Badminton World Cup (1996); and the Asian Championships (2000). She was part of the Indonesia winning team at the 1989 Sudirman Cup, helped the team defeat South Korea in group 1A, where she played in the mixed doubles with Aryono Miranat beating Park Joo-bong and Chung Myung-hee in straight games.

Minarti and Kusharjanto did not quite capture titles at any of badminton's three most prestigious tournaments for individual players: the Olympics, the World Championships, and the All-England Championships. They were runners-up at the 1997 All-Englands and bronze medalists at the 1997 IBF World Championships in Glasgow, Scotland. At the 2000 Olympics in Sydney, Australia they had to settle for a silver medal after losing an extremely close final to China's Zhang Jun and Gao Ling.

After retired from the national team, she moved to Philippines in 2003, and started a new career as a coach at the Philippines national badminton team. Timur also represented the Philippines in international tournaments. In 2016, she moved back to her home country, and later entered the Indonesia national badminton team as a women's singles assistant coach.

Achievements

Olympic Games 
Mixed doubles

World Championships 
Mixed doubles

World Cup 
Mixed doubles

Asian Games 
Mixed doubles

Asian Championships 
Women's doubles

Mixed doubles

Asian Cup 
Mixed doubles

Southeast Asian Games 
Mixed doubles

IBF World Grand Prix 
The World Badminton Grand Prix has been sanctioned by the International Badminton Federation from 1983 to 2006.

Women's singles

Women's doubles

Mixed doubles

 IBF Grand Prix tournament
 IBF Grand Prix Finals tournament

IBF International 
Mixed doubles

References

External links 
 
 
 
 
 Minarti Timur Masih Menunggu Pria Idaman 

1968 births
Living people
Sportspeople from Surabaya
Indonesian people of Chinese descent
Indonesian female badminton players
Badminton players at the 1996 Summer Olympics
Badminton players at the 2000 Summer Olympics
Olympic badminton players of Indonesia
Olympic silver medalists for Indonesia
Olympic medalists in badminton
Medalists at the 2000 Summer Olympics
Badminton players at the 1990 Asian Games
Badminton players at the 1998 Asian Games
Asian Games silver medalists for Indonesia
Asian Games bronze medalists for Indonesia
Asian Games medalists in badminton
Medalists at the 1990 Asian Games
Medalists at the 1998 Asian Games
Competitors at the 1989 Southeast Asian Games
Competitors at the 1993 Southeast Asian Games
Competitors at the 1995 Southeast Asian Games
Competitors at the 1997 Southeast Asian Games
Southeast Asian Games gold medalists for Indonesia
Southeast Asian Games silver medalists for Indonesia
Southeast Asian Games medalists in badminton
World No. 1 badminton players
Indonesian expatriate sportspeople in the Philippines
Filipino female badminton players
Badminton coaches